Villain Entertainment is a record label, founded by gangsta rapper MC Ren, in Palm Springs, California in 1999. The label's focus was gangsta rap genre of West Coast hip hop.

History 
Villain Entertainment was formed as a vehicle for releases by MC Ren, after he left Ruthless Records in 1999.
After MC Ren's departure from Ruthless Records, the label inherited the rights to all of MC Ren's solo albums, including Kizz My Black Azz, Shock of the Hour, The Villain in Black and Ruthless For Life. Although established in 1999, the label remained dormant for a long period until a revival in 2009, with the release of MC Ren's album Renincarnated.

Artists

Current acts 
MC Ren (Founder of label)

Discography

References

External links
 Villain Entertainment's Discography at Discogs

MC Ren
Hip hop record labels
American record labels
Record labels established in 2004
Compton, California
Gangsta rap record labels